Flaming Youth is a 1923 American silent drama film directed by John Francis Dillon and starring Colleen Moore and Milton Sills, based on the novel of the same name by Samuel Hopkins Adams. The film was produced and distributed by Associated First National. In his retrospective essay "Echoes of the Jazz Age", writer F. Scott Fitzgerald cited Flaming Youth as the only film that captured the sexual revolution of the Jazz Age.

The film is now considered partially lost. One reel survives and is housed at the Library of Congress.

Plot
When Mona Frentiss dies, she has her confidante "Doctor Bobs" watch over her family, especially her youngest daughter Patricia. The family has been raised in a most unconventional manner, with Mona having a much younger lover and the father Ralph keeping his own lover on the side. As Patricia grows older, she attracts the attention of her mother's former lover, the much older (than Patricia, who in the book is in her early to mid teens) Cary Scott. Patricia tempts fate with her wild ways, nearly loses her virtue to a musician aboard an ocean-going boat, and is saved in time by Cary. Realizing that he is the man for her, she settles down into an experimental marriage.

Cast

Background

There had been several films prior to Flaming Youth which used the flapper as subject matter, such as The Flapper with Olive Thomas, but the financial success of Flaming Youth made it the movie credited with launching a cycle of movies about flappers and helping Colleen Moore be seen as the originator of the screen flapper.

The film's marketing played up the racier aspects of the story, and a "skinny-dipping" sequence shot in silhouette (which still largely survives in the Library of Congress) was used in the films advertising extensively.  The ads also boasted "neckers, petters, white kisses, red kisses, pleasure mad daughters, [and] sensation craving mothers." The book contained adult subjects which were largely glossed over in the film. To counter potential negative backlash, a good deal of humor was injected into the film, so that many audiences thought the film was actually a burlesque of the whole flapper movement when, in fact, it was intended to be a dramatic film.<ref>Gebhart, Myrtel. Los Angeles Times (May 18, 1924)</ref>

Reception
Public success
The public reaction to the film was enthusiastic, and it firmly fixed in the public's imagination a new kind of female behavior. In his retrospective essay "Echoes of the Jazz Age," author F. Scott Fitzgerald cited Flaming Youth as the only motion picture that captured the sexual revolution of the Jazz Age. He lamented that its runaway success prompted "Hollywood hacks" to create a number of similar but less daring films and to run "the theme into its cinematographic grave." He also emphasized the fact that Flaming Youth persuaded certain moralistic Americans that their young girls could be "seduced without being ruined." Fitzgerald also praised Colleen Moore's performance in the film, remarking that: "I was the spark that lit up Flaming Youth, Colleen Moore was the torch."

Critical reviews
While Flaming Youth was successful enough to be held over in most American cities, reactions from film critics were mixed. The January 12, 1924 issue of The Exhibitor's Trade Review cites a review from the Chicago News which called the film "one of the best-told screen novels that has come along", and another review from the Cincinnati Enquirer in which the critic pointed out that the film was not completely faithful to the book. He added that "throughout the production, scarcely a single admirable character appears, and the audience is regaled with the antics of a lot of childish adults and adulterated children. Consequently, the members of the cast, though many of them are talented, work against unfair handicaps." A reviewer for the Indiana Star wrote, "In spite of an awkward story, Miss Moore contributes much merriment to the occasion and Elliott Dexter and Milton Sills lend the frontier element of the film a certain degree of stability."

A critic for The New York Times wrote, "Colleen Moore gives a vivid performance of the jazz-devoted novice once she gets her hold of the theme. There are moments in the beginning when her rendition is a little artificial. But after her awkward trip downstairs in exotic pajamas—which are not really graceful—she lives the part of a pert young thing, whose hair is cut with a bang on the forehead, whose eyes are full of mischief and whose arms are long and slender." The New York Times critic also described Milton Sills as "sympathetic" and Myrtle Stedman as "charming."

Censorship
When Flaming Youth debuted in Québec cinemas in January 1924, Judge Philippe-Auguste Choquette was petitioned by a delegation of Montreal women to ban the motion picture. They asserted the foreign American film was "obscene" and morally corrosive to young Canadian girls. In response, Judge Choquette ordered all film prints to be seized and all lobby cards to be confiscated. Additionally, theater owners and projectionists who exhibited the film were arrested.

Due to these highly-publicized actions, a legal court case ensued over the film. The case regarding the film was transferred to Judge Arthur Lachance of the Court of Sessions. Lachance privately viewed the film and deemed its contents to be "immoral." Shortly thereafter, the Canadian board of censors rescinded their previous approval of the film and, thenceforward, Flaming Youth'' could not be shown at any cinema in Canada "without violating the Canadian criminal code."

See also
 List of incomplete or partially lost films

References

External links

 
 
 
 

1923 films
1923 drama films
1923 lost films
American black-and-white films
Silent American drama films
American silent feature films
Films based on American novels
Films directed by John Francis Dillon
First National Pictures films
Lost American films
Lost drama films
1920s American films